Steve Darcis was the defending champion but chose not to defend his title.

Félix Auger-Aliassime won the title after defeating Mathias Bourgue 6–4, 6–1 in the final.

Seeds

Draw

Finals

Top half

Bottom half

References
Main Draw
Qualifying Draw

Open Sopra Steria de Lyon - Singles
2017 Singles
2017 in French tennis